Chapeltown Academy is a free school sixth form located in the Chapeltown area of Sheffield, South Yorkshire, England. It was the first free school approved and opened in Sheffield.

Established in 2014, Chapeltown Academy offers A-level courses to students. It is located in a purpose-designed building at the Hydra Business Park. It was previously based at Thorncliffe Hall in the Thorncliffe Industrial Estate.

References

External links
Chapeltown Academy official website

Free schools in Yorkshire
Educational institutions established in 2014
2014 establishments in England
Education in Sheffield